The Guadeloupe national football team represents the French overseas department and region of Guadeloupe in men's international football. The team is controlled by the Ligue Guadeloupéenne de Football, a local branch of French Football Federation.

As an overseas department of the French Republic, Guadeloupe is not a member of FIFA and is therefore not eligible to enter the FIFA World Cup or any competition organized first-hand by the organization. Guadeloupeans, being French citizens, are eligible to play for the France national football team. Guadeloupe is, however, a member of CONCACAF and the CFU and is eligible for all competitions organized by both the organizations. Indeed, according to the status of the FFF (article 34, paragraph 6): "[...]Under the control of related continental confederations, and with the agreement of the FFF, those leagues can organize international sport events at a regional level or set up teams in order to participate to them."'

Guadeloupe's highest honor to date was reaching the final at the 2010 Caribbean Championship where they were defeated by Jamaica on penalties. In the CONCACAF Gold Cup, Guadeloupe reached the semi-finals in 2007. The team performed well in the group stage defeating Canada and drawing with Haiti. In the knockout stage of the competition, Guadeloupe eliminated Honduras in the quarterfinals. In the semi-finals, Guadeloupe lost to Mexico 1–0. The regional team also participates in the Caribbean Cup and the Coupe de l'Outre-Mer. Guadeloupe has yet to win either competition.

History
International success
Guadeloupe was a surprise qualifier for the CONCACAF Gold Cup in 2007. The regional team earned qualification to the tournament after finishing in 4th place at the 2006–07 Caribbean Nations Cup. The appearance in the Gold Cup marked Guadeloupe's first in the competition and they opened the campaign on 6 June 2007 with a 1–1 draw against Haiti. In the team's following match against Canada, Guadeloupe recorded a 2–1 victory in front of 20,000 spectators at the Orange Bowl in Miami. The team finally succumbed to defeat losing 1–0 to the reigning champions of UNCAF, Costa Rica, to close out group play.

Guadeloupe advanced to the knockout stage of the competition as a result of being the second best performing third-place team in group play. In the quarterfinals, Guadeloupe were pitted against  Honduras and earned an upset victory defeating the Hondurans 2–1 at the Reliant Stadium in Houston. Prior to its elimination, Honduras had been equal to the task of Guadeloupe having beaten Mexico 2–1 and dominating Cuba 5–0. In the ensuing round, Guadeloupe were defeated by Mexico 1–0. However, despite the loss, Guadeloupe were praised for its strong defensive performance. Guadeloupe's finish in the tournament was the best finish by a Caribbean island team since Trinidad and Tobago reached the semifinals of the 2000 tournament.

Guadeloupe's respectable third-place finish in the 2008 Caribbean Championship meant a consecutive appearance in the Gold Cup. Ahead of the competition, regional team coach Roger Salnot sought to increase Guadeloupe's chances of winning by calling up players of Guadeloupean descent who were born in metropolitan France. Salnot named notable players to his preliminary squad such as goalkeeper Yohann Thuram, defenders Daniel Congré, Michaël Ciani, Ronald Zubar, midfielders Étienne and Aurélien Capoue, and Ludovic Sylvestre, and attackers Alexandre Alphonse, Claudio Beauvue, and Richard Socrier. All players had been effective players in Ligue 1 and abroad. However, despite calling up an abundance of talent, only Alexandre Alphonse was allowed participation by his club. Every other player either personally turned down the invitation or was denied by his parent club with Salnot expressing his disappointment at the latter issue.

In the tournament, Guadeloupe were inserted to Group C alongside Mexico, Panama, and Nicaragua. The team started off the group with two straight victories defeating Panama 2–1 at the Oakland–Alameda County Coliseum and systematically disabling the Nicaraguans 2–0 at the Reliant Stadium in Houston. In the team's final group stage match against Mexico, Guadeloupe was beaten 2–0 in Phoenix. Guadeloupe's second-place finish in the group meant another appearance in the knockout stage, where the team was pitted against Costa Rica in the quarter-finals at Cowboys Stadium in Arlington, Texas. In the match, it was Costa Rica who dominated scoring twice within the first 20 minutes of the match. Costa Rica finished the match with five goals with Guadeloupe getting a consolation goal from Alphonse in the second half.

In 2021, Guadeloupe once again qualified to compete for the Gold Cup.

Recent results and forthcoming fixtures
The following is a list of match results in the last 12 months, as well as any future matches that have been scheduled.

2022

2023

Coaching history

 Roger Salnot (2001–2011)
 Steve Bizasène (2012–2017)
 Jocelyn Angloma (2017–present)

Players
Current squad
The following players were called up for the 2022–23 CONCACAF Nations League B matches against Antigua and Barbuda and Cuba on 23 and 26 March respectively.Caps and goals as of 12 June 2022 after the match against Barbados.Recent call-ups
The following footballers were called up in the last 12 months.

Previous squads

CONCACAF Gold Cup squads
2007 CONCACAF Gold Cup squads – Guadeloupe
2009 CONCACAF Gold Cup squads – Guadeloupe
2011 CONCACAF Gold Cup squads – Guadeloupe
2021 CONCACAF Gold Cup squads – Guadeloupe

Caribbean Championship
2010 Caribbean Championship – Guadeloupe

Player recordsPlayers in bold are still active with Guadeloupe.Most appearances

Top goalscorers

Competitive record
Gold Cup record
Guadeloupe has participated in four of the sixteen CONCACAF Gold Cups contested. The team's first appearance in the competition was in 2007. The team reached the semi-finals where they were defeated by Mexico. Two years later, in 2009, Guadeloupe made their second consecutive appearance in the competition and, for the second straight time, reached the knockout stage of the Gold Cup. In the quarter-finals, Guadeloupe were defeated by Costa Rica.

CONCACAF Nations League

Caribbean Cup record
Guadeloupe appeared in seven Caribbean Cups. The regional team never won the competition, but finished in third place on three occasions in 1989, 1994, and 2008. From the 2007 competition onwards, Guadeloupe finished inside the top four teams in the proceeding Caribbean Cups. In 2010, the team finished runners-up to Jamaica, losing 5–4 on penalties.

Coupe de l'Outre-Mer record
Guadeloupe has participated in both editions of the Coupe de l'Outre-Mer, which was established in 2008. In both editions, the team finished in third place behind Martinique and Réunion with the latter team winning the first edition and Martinique winning the second.

CFU Championship record
From 1978–1985, Guadeloupe participated in the CFU Championship, a precursor to the Caribbean Cup. Of the six championships played, Guadeloupe featured in two final rounds and departed each tournament without a single win.*Draws include knockout matches decided by penalty shootout.**Gold background colour indicates that the tournament was won. Red border colour indicates tournament was held on home soil.''

Notes

References

External links
 Official website

 
Caribbean national association football teams
CONCACAF teams not affiliated to FIFA
National football teams of Overseas France